Tarmac Building Products is a British producer of building products, based in Wolverhampton. The company was formerly part of the Tarmac Group, but was bought in 2014 by the joint venture of Lafarge and Tarmac's parent Anglo American, Lafarge Tarmac. Lafarge Tarmac was subsequently sold to CRH plc in August 2015 and rebranded as Tarmac.

References

External links

Manufacturing companies based in Wolverhampton